HMS Goldfinch was a  of the Royal Navy, built at Sheerness Dockyard and launched on 18 May 1889.

Service

She commenced service on the Australia Station in March 1890. She left the Australia Station in August 1899 and returned to England. She was converted into a survey vessel in January 1902, and commissioned by Commander Frederick Charles Learmonth on 4 February 1902. She left Sheerness for the Mediterranean later that month on surveying duties. In October 1902 she left Malta for the West Coast of Africa, visiting Sierra Leone and Calabar in December.

Fate
Goldfinch returned to Sheerness for refitting for continued service in 1906, but was found to be in poor condition and the sloop  was refitted as a survey ship to replace her. Goldfinch was sold on 14 May 1907 for breaking up.

Citations

References
Bastock, John (1988), Ships on the Australia Station, Child & Associates Publishing Pty Ltd; Frenchs Forest, Australia. 

 

1889 ships
Ships built in Sheerness
Victorian-era gunboats of the United Kingdom
Redbreast-class gunboats